Surd is a village in Zala County, Hungary.

The village is best known for its production of Christmas trees.

Culture
The Hungarian folk song Röpülj, páva, röpülj was collected in 1935 in Surd by Vilmos Seemayer.

History 
Surd was known since 1268, when it was presented as the estate of the Hahót family. In 1471 it was the estate of the Kanizsai family.

From 1659 it had a Lutheran pastor. 

In 1848, Croatians burned the village more times.

References

External links 
 Street map 
 

Populated places in Zala County